Villa Patti is a monumental semi-rural house on Via Santa Maria de Gesu, Caltagirone in Sicily, Italy. It now houses the Museo delle Ville Storiche Caltagironesi e Siciliane.

History 
A house belonging to the aristocrat Patti was present at the site by the 19th century. It was refurbished by architect Gian Battista Nicastro, who created the decorative Neo-Gothic facade. The windows and roofline merlions recall Venetian Gothic architecture. The house is surrounded by a park, once partly a farm.

Museo delle Ville Storiche Caltagironesi e Siciliane 
The museum houses artworks and photographs of the region's aristocratic life. It contains displays of local ceramics, including vases and maiolica tiles.

References

Palaces in Sicily
Museums in Sicily
Buildings and structures in Caltagirone
Gothic Revival architecture in Italy